Pharnabazus or Pharnabazos is the Hellenized form of an ancient Persian name. It may refer to:
Pharnabazus I of Iberia (326–234 BCE), king of Iberia
Pharnabazus II of Iberia (63–32 BCE), king of Iberia
Pharnabazus I (fl. 455–430 BCE), satrap of Hellespontine Phrygia
Pharnabazus II (fl. 422–387 BCE), grandson of the above, satrap of Hellespontine Phrygia
Pharnabazus III (c. 370 – after 320 BC), grandson of the above, a general who resisted the invasion of Alexander the Great.